The 1st Guards Army was a Soviet Guards field army that fought on the Eastern Front during World War II.

First Formation
On August 6, 1942, the army formed from the 2nd Reserve Army with five Guards Rifle Divisions,  the 37th, 38th, 39th, 40th and 41st. On August 9, the army was incorporated into Southeastern Front. On August 18, it was transferred to the Stalingrad Front (renamed Don Front on September 30).

During the German Sixth Army's assault on Stalingrad in August 1942, the Red Army launched a counter-offensive to drive the German forces back.  The 1st Guards Army and the 24th Army launched the attack.  Little success was met.  The 1st Guards Army managed an advance of just a few miles, while the 24th Army was pushed back right into its start-line.

On October 16, 1942, the headquarters of the army transferred into Stavka reserve and its troops transferred to the 24th Army. On 25 October 1942 the army was disbanded, its headquarters was converted to the field management of the 2nd formation of Southwestern Front according to the Stavka directive of 22 October 1942.

Commanders
Lieutenant General Filipp Ivanovich Golikov(August 1942)
Guard Major General Artillery Kirill Semenovich Moskalenko (August–October 1942)
Guard Major General Ivan Mikhailovich Chistyakov (October 1942).

Second Formation
On November 5, 1942, 1st Guards Army was reformed from 63rd Army according to the Stavka directive of November 1.
The army was a part of Southwestern Front. When the German troops were making their attack on Stalingrad, the First Guards Army was facing the Italian Eighth Army in the upper part of the Don River. The Army participated in Stalingrad strategic offensive Operation Uranus. As the right flank of the front shock group, 1st Guards Army with 5th Tank Army created the appearance of the Stalingrad encirclement "boiler".

On December 5, 1942, 1st Guards Army is split, its left wing being renamed 3rd Guards Army of the Southwestern Front.

Commander
Lieutenant General Dmitri Danilovich Lelyushenko (November – December 1942 ).

Third Formation
The 1st Guards Army was created on December 8, 1942, according to the Stavka directive of December 5, 1942. The troops of the army was formed from the part of the operational group of Southwestern Front, and the headquarters of the army formed of management of 4th Army Reserve. It is composed of units of the right wing of the previous version of the 1st guard army and some reinforcement units : the 4th Guards Rifle Corps, the 6th Guards Rifle Corps, the 153rd Rifle Division, and the 18th Tank Corps. After the German relief operation was held, the 1st Guards Army, along with the 6th Army and 3rd Guards Army, launched an attack in Operation Little Saturn.  During the operation the Soviets defeated the Italian Eighth Army and gained a respectable amount of territory.  By the end of the year, the 1st Guards Army was outside Millerovo.

The 1st Guards Army also took part in Operation Saturn, where the Red Army successfully drove back Army Group South to the Donets Basin in the Ukraine.  The 1st Guards Army was part of the Soviet Southwestern Front, and took part in the victorious Soviet pushing into Germany in 1943 to 1945. Also, in 1943, the 1st Guards Army was the first unit of the soviet army to operate the new T-34/85 tank. Among its units when the war ended in 1945 was the 81st Rifle Division. In August, the 1st Guards Army became the headquarters of the Kiev Military District.

Commanders
Lieutenant-General, and from May 1943, Colonel-General Vasily Ivanovich Kuznetsov (December 1942 – December 1943 )
Colonel-General Andrei Antonovich Grechko (December 1943 – the end of the war).

After World War II
In July 1958, the 1st Separate Combined Arms Army (the Special Mechanized Army until 1957) was moved from its headquarters in Budapest to Chernigov and renamed the 1st Combined Arms Army. The 1st Combined Arms Army was subordinated to the Kiev Military District and in 1960 consisted of the 72nd, 81st and 115th Guards Motor Rifle Divisions, as well as the 35th Guards Tank Division. On 5 October 1967, it was renamed the 1st Guards Combined Arms Army at the request of now-Minister of Defense Grechko, who had commanded the army's third formation during World War II. On 22 February 1968, it was awarded the Order of the Red Banner. For a period the army HQ was actually an operations group of the District. By this time it had been awarded the Order of Lenin. It included among its forces the 72nd Guards Motor Rifle Division, and the 25th Guards Motor Rifle Division.

After the collapse of the Soviet Union the Army became the 1st Army Corps of the Ukrainian Ground Forces, and then Territorial Directorate "North".

Commanders 
The following officers commanded the 1st Guards Combined Arms Army and the previous 1st Combined Arms Army.
 Lieutenant General Vasily Arkhipov (formation – 23 May 1960)
 Colonel General Alexander Rodimtsev (23 May 1960 – 18 March 1966)
 Lieutenant General Grigory Batalov (18 March 1966 – 13 June 1969)
 Lieutenant General Sergey Molokoedov (13 June 1969 – 2 September 1970)
 Lieutenant General Grigory Gorodetsky (2 September 1970 – 1973)
 ?? (1973–1976)
 Lieutenant General Alexander Elagin (1976 – September 1979)
 Lieutenant General Aleksey Fyodorov (September 1979 – May 1982)
 Lieutenant General Alexey Demidov (May 1982 – 1984)
 ?? (1984 – May 1988)
 Lieutenant General Valentin Bobryshev (May 1988 – 1 August 1991)
 Major General Andrei Nikolayev (1 August 1991 – February 1992)

Notes

References

 http://samsv.narod.ru/Arm/ag01/arm.html (Russian)

G001
Military units and formations established in 1942
Military units and formations disestablished in 1991
Guards Armies